The George Richardson Memorial Trophy was presented annually from 1932 until 1971, by the Canadian Amateur Hockey Association. It represented the Eastern Canada junior hockey championship, and a berth in the Memorial Cup final versus the Abbott Cup champion from Western Canada. The George Richardson Memorial Trophy was retired in 1971, when the Memorial Cup became a round-robin series between the winners of the three major junior hockey leagues in Canada; the Western Hockey League, the Ontario Hockey League and Quebec Major Junior Hockey League. The trophy was named for Captain George Taylor Richardson, a hockey player who died while serving in World War I.

Captain Richardson

Captain George Taylor Richardson (September 14, 1886 – February 9, 1916) was a Canadian ice hockey player, businessman, philanthropist, and later a soldier. Richardson was considered one of the finest amateurs of his time. He played for the Queen's University team that challenged the Ottawa Hockey Club for the 1906 Stanley Cup, and played for the 14th Regiment of Kingston team won the Ontario Hockey Association title, and the J. Ross Robertson Cup in 1908, and the 1909 Allan Cup. He was enshrined in the Hockey Hall of Fame in 1950. Richardson was part of a prominent Kingston, Ontario family that owned and operated James Richardson & Sons. He joined the Canadian Expeditionary Forces in World War I, and died in action in Belgium, and was created a Chevalier of the Legion of Honour of the French Third Republic.

History
The George Richardson Memorial Trophy was donated to the Canadian Amateur Hockey Association (CAHA) by James Armstrong Richardson Sr. in memory of his brother in April 1932. The original three trustees named for the trophy were James T. Sutherland, W. A. Hewitt and Fred Marples.

The trophy was presented annually from 1932 until 1971. It represented the Eastern Canada junior hockey championship, and a berth in the Memorial Cup final versus the Abbott Cup champion from Western Canada. The George Richardson Memorial Trophy was retired in 1971, when the Memorial Cup became a round-robin series between the winners of the three major junior hockey leagues in Canada; the Western Hockey League, the Ontario Hockey League and Quebec Major Junior Hockey League.

Playoff format
The Eastern Canada junior playoffs were open to the champions from five respective regions. However, league champions did not always participate, and the format varied depending on the number of teams. In the late 1950s, the Junior Canadiens participated as an independent team. Ontario-based teams won the most championships. No team from the Maritimes ever won the George Richardson Memorial Trophy, and the last time a Northern Ontario team won it occurred in 1937.

1951 series
CAHA vice-president W. B. George oversaw the Barrie Flyers versus Quebec Citadels series for the George Richardson Memorial Trophy, to represent Eastern Canada in the 1951 Memorial Cup playoffs. When the Citadels refused to play game five in Barrie, George gave them an ultimatum to play or forfeit the series. Quebec decided to play too late to arrive by train, but arrived half an hour late after flying. George scheduled game seven on neutral ice at Maple Leaf Gardens, despite protests from Flyers' coach Hap Emms who claimed that his team only agreed to resume the series if game seven was played in Barrie.

1971 series
Ontario Hockey Association (OHA) president Tubby Schmalz announced that teams from the OHA and the Quebec Major Junior Hockey League would not play against any team from the Western Canada Hockey League (WCHL) for the 1971 Memorial Cup, due to disagreements over travel allowances given to team at the Memorial Cup and the higher number of over-age players allowed on WCHL rosters. He said that plans for an Eastern Canada series for the Richardson Trophy would go ahead. That made the 1971 Richardson Cup a potential national championship. 

The final Richardson Trophy in 1971 was played between the Quebec Remparts and the St. Catharines Black Hawks, and was controversial due to violence and off-ice disputes causing its abandonment before completion. The series was played when tensions were high between Anglophone Canadians and Francophone nationalists, and featured future NHL stars Guy Lafleur and Marcel Dionne. The series was intended to be best-of-seven, but ended after five games with the Remparts leading three games to two. St. Catharines refused to return to Quebec City due to violence that occurred after game four, and threats from the Front de libération du Québec against its players. CAHA president Earl Dawson declared the series over when no further compromise could be reached. The Quebec Remparts ultimately accepted the challenge by the Western Canada champion Edmonton Oil Kings to play for the Memorial Cup.

Champions and finalists
List of champions and finalists of the George Richardson Memorial Trophy.
Number in parenthesis denotes total number of championships won.

See also
 List of Canadian Hockey League awards

References

External links
 
 History of hockey and the Canadian military Veterans Affairs Canada

1932 establishments in Canada
1971 disestablishments in Canada
Canadian Amateur Hockey Association trophies
Canadian Hockey League trophies and awards
Ice hockey tournaments in Canada
Memorial Cup